This is a complete list of Scottish Statutory Instruments in 1999.

1-100
 Environmental Impact Assessment (Scotland) Regulations 1999 (S.S.I. 1999/1)
 Food Protection (Emergency Prohibitions) (Amnesic Shellfish Poisoning) (No. 2) Order 1999 (S.S.I. 1999/3)
 Food Protection (Emergency Prohibitions) (Amnesic Shellfish Poisoning) (Scotland) Order 1999 (S.S.I. 1999/7)
 Food Protection (Emergency Prohibitions) (Amnesic Shellfish Poisoning) (No.2) (Scotland) Order 1999 (S.S.I. 1999/13)
 Food (Animals and Animal Products from Belgium) (Emergency Control) (Scotland) Order 1999 (S.S.I. 1999/14)
 Animal Feedingstuffs from Belgium (Control) (Scotland) Regulations 1999 (S.S.I. 1999/15)
 Food Protection (Emergency Prohibitions) (Amnesic Shellfish Poisoning) (No.3) (Scotland) Order 1999 (S.S.I. 1999/18)
 Plant Health (Amendment) (Scotland) Order 1999 (S.S.I. 1999/22)
 Food Protection (Emergency Prohibitions) (Amnesic Shellfish Poisoning) (No. 4) (Scotland) Order 1999 (S.S.I. 1999/23)
 Food Protection (Emergency Prohibitions) (Amnesic Shellfish Poisoning) (East Coast) (Scotland) Order 1999 (S.S.I. 1999/25)
 Food Protection (Emergency Prohibitions) (Amnesic Shellfish Poisoning) (West Coast) (Scotland) Order 1999 (S.S.I. 1999/26)
 Food Protection (Emergency Prohibitions) (Amnesic Shellfish Poisoning) (Orkney) (Scotland) Order 1999 (S.S.I. 1999/27)
 Food (Animals and Animal Products from Belgium) (Emergency Control) (No.2) (Scotland) Order 1999 (S.S.I. 1999/32)
 Animal Feedingstuffs from Belgium (Control) (No.2) (Scotland) Regulations 1999 (S.S.I. 1999/33)
 Spreadable Fats (Marketing Standards) (Scotland) Regulations 1999 (S.S.I. 1999/34)
 Fraserburgh Harbour Revision Order 1999 (S.S.I. 1999/40)
 Food Protection (Emergency Prohibitions) (Amnesic Shellfish Poisoning) (East Coast) Revocation (Scotland) Order 1999 (S.S.I. 1999/41)
 Food Protection (Emergency Prohibitions) (Amnesic Shellfish Poisoning) (Orkney) (No.2) (Scotland) Order 1999 (S.S.I. 1999/42)
 Environmental Impact Assessment (Forestry) (Scotland) Regulations 1999 (S.S.I. 1999/43)
 Criminal Legal Aid (Fixed Payments) (Scotland) Amendment Regulations 1999 (S.S.I. 1999/48)
 Food Protection (Emergency Prohibitions) (Amnesic Shellfish Poisoning) (Orkney) Partial Revocation (Scotland) Order 1999 (S.S.I. 1999/49)
 Food Protection (Emergency Prohibitions) (Amnesic Shellfish Poisoning) (West Coast) (No.2) (Scotland) Order 1999 (S.S.I. 1999/50)
 National Health Service (General Dental Services) (Scotland) Amendment (No.2) Regulations 1999 (S.S.I. 1999/51)
 Scottish Dental Practice Board Amendment Regulations 1999 (S.S.I. 1999/52)
 National Health Service (Service Committees and Tribunal) (Scotland) Amendment Regulations 1999 (S.S.I. 1999/53)
 National Health Service (General Medical Services) (Scotland) Amendment (No.4) Regulations 1999 (S.S.I. 1999/54)
 National Health Service (General Ophthalmic Services) (Scotland) Amendment (No.2) Regulations 1999 (S.S.I. 1999/55)
 Health Act 1999 (Fund-Holding Practices) (Transfer of Assets, Savings, Rights and Liabilities and Transitional Provisions) (Scotland) Order 1999 (S.S.I. 1999/56)
 National Health Service (Pharmaceutical Services) (Scotland) Amendment Regulations 1999 (S.S.I. 1999/57)
 Smoke Control Areas (Exempted Fireplaces) (Scotland) Order 1999 (S.S.I. 1999/58)
 Road Traffic (Permitted Parking Area and Special Parking Area) (City of Glasgow) Designation Order 1999 (S.S.I. 1999/59)
 Road Traffic (Parking Adjudicators) (City of Glasgow) Regulations 1999 (S.S.I. 1999/60)
 Road Traffic Act 1991 (Amendment of Schedule 3) (Scotland) Order 1999 (S.S.I. 1999/61)
 Parking Attendants (Wearing of Uniforms) (City of Glasgow Parking Area) Regulations 1999 (S.S.I. 1999/62)
 National Health Service (Travelling Expenses and Remission of Charges) (Scotland) Amendment Regulations 1999 (S.S.I. 1999/63)
 National Health Service (Optical Charges and Payments) (Scotland) Amendment (No.2) Regulations 1999 (S.S.I. 1999/64)
 Educational Development, Research and Services (Scotland) Grant Regulations 1999 (S.S.I. 1999/65)
 Food Protection (Emergency Prohibitions) (Amnesic Shellfish Poisoning) (West Coast) (No. 3) (Scotland) Order 1999 (S.S.I. 1999/71)
 Food Protection (Emergency Prohibitions) (Amnesic Shellfish Poisoning) (East Coast) (No. 2) (Scotland) Order 1999 (S.S.I. 1999/72)
 Food Protection (Emergency Prohibitions) (Amnesic Shellfish Poisoning) (Orkney) (No. 3) (Scotland) Order 1999 (S.S.I. 1999/73)
 Argyll and Clyde Acute Hospitals National Health Service Trust (Establishment) Amendment (No. 2) Order 1999 (S.S.I. 1999/77)
 Lanarkshire Acute Hospitals National Health Service Trust (Establishment) Amendment Order 1999 (S.S.I. 1999/78)
 Forth Valley Acute Hospitals National Health Service Trust (Establishment) Amendment Order 1999 (S.S.I. 1999/79)
 Highland Acute Hospitals National Health Service Trust (Establishment) Amendment Order 1999 (S.S.I. 1999/80)
 Lothian University Hospitals National Health Service Trust (Establishment) Amendment (No. 2) Order 1999 (S.S.I. 1999/81)
 Grampian University Hospitals National Health Service Trust (Establishment) Amendment Order 1999 (S.S.I. 1999/82)
 Tayside Primary Care National Health Service Trust (Establishment) Amendment (No.2) Order 1999 (S.S.I. 1999/83)
 Tayside University Hospitals National Health Service Trust (Establishment) Amendment Order 1999 (S.S.I. 1999/84)
 South Glasgow University Hospitals National Health Service Trust (Establishment) Amendment Order 1999 (S.S.I. 1999/85)
 North Glasgow University Hospitals National Health Service Trust (Establishment) Amendment Order 1999 (S.S.I. 1999/86)
 Greater Glasgow Primary Care National Health Service Trust (Establishment) Amendment Order 1999 (S.S.I. 1999/87)
 Lobsters and Crawfish (Prohibition of Fishing and Landing) (Scotland) Order 1999 (S.S.I. 1999/88)
 Lanarkshire Primary Care National Health Service Trust (Establishment) Amendment Order 1999 (S.S.I. 1999/89)
 Health Act 1999 (Commencement No. 4) Order 1999 (S.S.I. 1999/90)
 West Lothian Healthcare National Health Service Trust(Establishment) Amendment Order 1999 (S.S.I. 1999/91)
 Borders Primary Care National Health Service Trust (Establishment)Amendment Order 1999 (S.S.I. 1999/92)
 Highland Primary Care National Health Service Trust (Establishment)Amendment (No. 2) Order 1999 (S.S.I. 1999/93)
 Fife Primary Care National Health Service Trust (Establishment)Amendment Order 1999 (S.S.I. 1999/94)
 Lothian Primary Care National Health Service Trust (Establishment)Amendment Order 1999 (S.S.I. 1999/95)
 Dumfries and Galloway Primary Care National Health Service Trust(Establishment) Amendment Order 1999 (S.S.I. 1999/96)
 Renfrewshire and Inverclyde Primary Care National Health ServiceTrust (Establishment) Amendment Order 1999 (S.S.I. 1999/97)
 Grampian Primary Care National Health Service Trust (Establishment)Amendment Order 1999 (S.S.I. 1999/98)
 Lomond and Argyll Primary Care National Health Service Trust(Establishment) Amendment Order 1999 (S.S.I. 1999/99)

101-200

 Registration of Births, Still-Births, Deaths and Marriages (Prescription of Forms) (Scotland) Amendment Regulations 1999 (S.S.I. 1999/104)
 Organic Aid (Scotland) Amendment Regulations 1999 (S.S.I. 1999/107)
 Act of Sederunt (Rules of the Court of Session Amendment No. 7) (Miscellaneous) 1999 (S.S.I. 1999/109)
 Food Protection (Emergency Prohibitions) (Amnesic Shellfish Poisoning) (East Coast) (No. 3) (Scotland) Order 1999 (S.S.I. 1999/110)
 Land Registration (Scotland) Act 1979 (Commencement No. 13) Order 1999 (S.S.I. 1999/111)
 Food Protection (Emergency Prohibitions) (Amnesic Shellfish Poisoning) (West Coast) Partial Revocation (Scotland) Order 1999 (S.S.I. 1999/114)
 Health Act 1999 (Commencement No. 6) (Scotland) Order 1999 (S.S.I. 1999/115)
 Erskine Bridge (Temporary Suspension of Tolls) Order 1999 (S.S.I. 1999/116)
 National Health Service (Penalty Charge) (Scotland) Regulations 1999 (S.S.I. 1999/121)
 Education (Student Loans) (Scotland) Amendment Regulations 1999 (S.S.I. 1999/124)
 Food Protection (Emergency Prohibitions) (Amnesic Shellfish Poisoning) (North Coast) (Scotland) Order 1999 (S.S.I. 1999/125)
 Thurso College (Change of Name) (Scotland) Order 1999 (S.S.I. 1999/126)
 West of Scotland Water Authority (Lochranza - Allt Easan Biorach) Water Order 1999 (S.S.I. 1999/127)
 West of Scotland Water Authority (Kilberry, Allt Dail A'Chairn) Water Order 1999 (S.S.I. 1999/128)
 Plant Health (Scotland) Amendment (No. 2) Order 1999 (S.S.I. 1999/129)
 Wafer Scottish Seal Directions 1999 (S.S.I. 1999/130)
 Water Industry Act 1999 (Commencement No. 1) (Scotland) Order 1999 (S.S.I. 1999/133)
 Shellfish (Specification of Molluscs and Crustaceans) (Scotland) Regulations 1999 (S.S.I. 1999/139)
 Council Tax (Exempt Dwellings) (Scotland) Amendment (No. 2) Order 1999 (S.S.I. 1999/140)
 Food Protection (Emergency Prohibitions) (Amnesic Shellfish Poisoning) (West Coast) Partial Revocation (No. 2) (Scotland) Order 1999 (S.S.I. 1999/141)
 Food Protection (Emergency Prohibitions) (Amnesic Shellfish Poisoning) (West Coast) (No. 4) (Scotland) Order 1999 (S.S.I. 1999/143)
 Food Protection (Emergency Prohibitions) (Amnesic Shellfish Poisoning) (Orkney) (No. 3) (Scotland) Partial Revocation Order 1999 (S.S.I. 1999/144)
 Food Protection (Emergency Prohibitions) (Amnesic Shellfish Poisoning) (East Coast) (No. 3) (Scotland) Partial Revocation Order 1999 (S.S.I. 1999/145)
 Act of Sederunt (Fees of Solicitors in the Sheriff Court) (Amendment) 1999 (S.S.I. 1999/149)
 Act of Sederunt (Fees of Sheriff Officers) 1999 (S.S.I. 1999/150)
 Act of Sederunt (Fees of Messengers-at-Arms) 1999 (S.S.I. 1999/151)
 Non-Domestic Rating Contributions (Scotland) Amendment Regulations 1999 (S.S.I. 1999/153)
 Local Statutory Provisions (Postponement from Repeal) (Scotland) Order 1999 (S.S.I. 1999/156)
 Local Statutory Provisions (Exemption from Repeal) (Scotland) Order 1999 (S.S.I. 1999/157)
 Maximum Number of Judges (Scotland) Order 1999 (S.S.I. 1999/158)
 Food Protection (Emergency Prohibitions) (Amnesic Shellfish Poisoning) (Orkney) (No. 3) (Scotland) Revocation Order 1999 (S.S.I. 1999/159)
 Food Protection (Emergency Prohibitions) (Amnesic Shellfish Poisoning) (Orkney) (No. 2) (Scotland) Partial Revocation Order 1999 (S.S.I. 1999/160)
 Forth Valley Primary Care National Health Service Trust (Establishment) Amendment (No. 2) Order 1999 (S.S.I. 1999/164)
 Ayrshire and Arran Primary Care National Health Service Trust (Establishment) Amendment (No. 2) Order 1999 (S.S.I. 1999/165)
 Act of Sederunt (Rules of the Court of Session Amendment No. 8) (Fees of Solicitors) 1999 (S.S.I. 1999/166)
 Food Protection (Emergency Prohibitions) (Amnesic Shellfish Poisoning) (West Coast) (No. 2) Revocation (Scotland) Order 1999 (S.S.I. 1999/167)
 Food Protection (Emergency Prohibitions) (Amnesic Shellfish Poisoning) (West Coast) (No.3) Revocation (Scotland) Order 1999 (S.S.I. 1999/168)
 Food Protection (Emergency Prohibitions) (Amnesic Shellfish Poisoning) (West Coast) Partial Revocation (No. 3) (Scotland) Order 1999 (S.S.I. 1999/169)
 Food Protection (Emergency Prohibitions) (Amnesic Shellfish Poisoning) (West Coast) (No. 4) Revocation (Scotland) Order 1999 (S.S.I. 1999/170)
 Contaminants in Food Amendment (Scotland) Regulations 1999 (S.S.I. 1999/171)
 Macduff Harbour Revision Order 1999 (S.S.I. 1999/172)
 Building Standards and Procedure Amendment (Scotland) Regulations 1999 (S.S.I. 1999/173)
 Scotland Act 1998 (Transitory and Transitional Provisions) (Appropriations) Amendment Order 1999 (S.S.I. 1999/175)
 Breeding of Dogs (Licensing Records) (Scotland) Regulations 1999 (S.S.I. 1999/176)
 Sale of Dogs (Identification Tag) (Scotland) Regulations 1999 (S.S.I. 1999/177)
 Beef Bones (Scotland) Regulations 1999 (S.S.I. 1999/186)
 Hill Livestock (Compensatory Allowances) (Scotland) Regulations 1999 (S.S.I. 1999/187)
 River Forth Salmon Fishery District (Baits and Lures) Regulations 1999 (S.S.I. 1999/188)
 River Don Salmon Fishery District (Baits and Lures) Regulations 1999 (S.S.I. 1999/189)
 Act of Adjournal (Criminal Procedure Rules Amendment No. 4) (Drug Treatment and Testing Orders) 1999 (S.S.I. 1999/191)
 Act of Sederunt (Rules of the Court of Session Amendment No.9) (Finance Act 1999) 1999 (S.S.I. 1999/192)
 The Shetland Islands Regulated Fishery (Scotland) Order 1999 (S.S.I. 1999/194)
 National Health Service (Scotland) (Injury Benefits) Amendment (No.2) Regulations 1999 (S.S.I. 1999/195)
 Invergarry-Kyle of Lochalsh Trunk Road (A87) Extension (Skye Bridge Crossing) Toll Order (Variation) Order 1999 (S.S.I. 1999/196)
 Ayrshire and Arran Acute Hospitals National Health Service Trust (Establishment) Amendment (No. 2) Order 1999 (S.S.I. 1999/197)
 Fife Acute Hospitals National Health Service Trust (Establishment) Amendment (No. 2) Order 1999 (S.S.I. 1999/198)
 National Trust for Scotland (Canna) Harbour Revision Order 1999 (S.S.I. 1999/199)
 Montrose Harbour Revision Order 1999 (S.S.I. 1999/200)

201-203

 Highland Council (Eigg) Harbour Empowerment Order 1999 (S.S.I. 1999/201)
 Scottish Natural Heritage (Rum) Harbour Empowerment Order 1999 (S.S.I. 1999/202)
 Highland Council (Muck) Harbour Empowerment Order 1999 (S.S.I. 1999/203)

External links
 Scottish Statutory Instrument List
 Scottish  Draft Statutory Instrument List

1999
Statutory Instruments
Scotland Statutory Instruments